Anolis impetigosus is a species of lizard in the family Dactyloidae. The species is found in Venezuela.

References

Anoles
Endemic fauna of Venezuela
Reptiles of Venezuela
Reptiles described in 1864
Taxa named by Edward Drinker Cope